The Lee Gardens North Historic District, also known as Woodbury Park Apartments, is a national historic district located at Arlington County, Virginia. It contains thirty attached masonry structures forming seven contributing buildings in a residential neighborhood in South Arlington. The garden apartment complex was designed by architect Mihran Mesrobian according to the original standards promoted by the Federal Housing Administration (FHA). The Lee Gardens North complex was completed in 1949–1950. The brick buildings are in the Colonial Revival style, with some fenestration elements influenced by the Art Deco and Moderne style.

It was listed on the National Register of Historic Places in 2004.

References

Residential buildings on the National Register of Historic Places in Virginia
Colonial Revival architecture in Virginia
Historic districts in Arlington County, Virginia
National Register of Historic Places in Arlington County, Virginia
Residential buildings completed in 1950
Historic districts on the National Register of Historic Places in Virginia